William Peter Bradshaw, Baron Bradshaw (born 9 September 1936), commonly known as Bill Bradshaw, is a British academic and politician.  A Liberal Democrat member of the House of Lords, he was formerly also a County Councillor in Oxfordshire from 1993 until his resignation in January 2008.

Biography 
The son of Leonard and Ivy Bradshaw, he was educated at Slough Grammar School and the University of Reading. He married Jill Hayward in 1957, by whom he has two offspring. After Jill's death in 2002, he married Diana Ayris in 2003.

After National Service from 1957 to 1959, he worked for British Rail from 1959 to 1985, starting as a management trainee in the Western Region and rising to the post of Director Policy Unit in 1980, and General Manager of British Rail Western Region 1983.

After leaving British Rail, he was Professor of Transport Management at the University of Salford from 1986 to 1992, a fellow of Wolfson College, Oxford, and Chairman of Ulsterbus and Citybus Ltd in Belfast from 1987 to 1993. He was a special adviser to the House of Commons Transport Select committee from 1992 to 1997.
  	 
He was created a Life peer as Baron Bradshaw, of Wallingford in the County of Oxfordshire on 22 July 1999.

References

External links
Announcement of Bradshaw's introduction into the House of Lords, House of Lords minutes of proceedings, 26 July 1999

1936 births
Living people
Liberal Democrats (UK) life peers
People educated at Upton Court Grammar School
Alumni of the University of Reading
Fellows of Wolfson College, Oxford
Academics of the University of Salford
Councillors in Oxfordshire
Members of Oxfordshire County Council
Liberal Democrats (UK) councillors
Life peers created by Elizabeth II